Hong Moo-Won (born August 15, 1981) is a South Korean amateur boxer best known to participate at the Olympics 2004 and winning a bronze medal at the Asian Games 2006 in Doha.

Career 
At the world championships 2003 he lost to eventual winner Sergey Kazakov 10:26, he did not participate in 2005 and 2007.

At Athens he beat Harry Tanamor but lost to eventual winner Yan Bartelemí. He qualified for the Athens Games by ending up in first place in the 2nd AIBA Asian 2004 Olympic Qualifying Tournament in Karachi, Pakistan. In the final he defeated Tanamor.

At Doha 2006 he also lost to the eventual winner Zou Shiming 9:17.

External links 
 2003
 2006 Asian Games
 

1981 births
Living people
South Korean male boxers
Olympic boxers of South Korea
Boxers at the 2004 Summer Olympics
Asian Games medalists in boxing
Asian Games bronze medalists for South Korea
Boxers at the 2006 Asian Games
Medalists at the 2006 Asian Games
Light-flyweight boxers